Fragile is the fourth studio album by the English progressive rock band Yes, released on 12 November 1971 by Atlantic Records. It was the band's first album to feature keyboardist Rick Wakeman, who replaced Tony Kaye after the group had finished touring their breakthrough record, The Yes Album (1971).

The band entered rehearsals in London in August 1971, but Kaye's reluctance to play electronic keyboards led to his departure from the group. He was quickly replaced by Wakeman, whose virtuosity, compositional skills, and experience with the electric piano, organ, Mellotron, and Moog synthesizer expanded the band's sound. Due to budget and time constraints, four tracks on the album are group compositions; the remaining five are short solo pieces written by each band member. The opening track, "Roundabout", became a popular and iconic song. The artwork for the album was the band's first to be designed by Roger Dean, who would design many of their future covers.

Fragile received a mostly positive reception, with some criticism directed at the solo tracks. It became a greater commercial success than its predecessor, reaching No. 4 on the US Billboard Top LPs chart and No. 7 on the UK Albums Chart. The Fragile Tour saw Yes perform over 100 dates across the UK and the US, during which they became a headlining act. An edited version of "Roundabout" was released as a single in the US in January 1972, which reached No. 13. Fragile was certified Platinum in the UK and double Platinum in the US, where it has sold over two million copies. It has been remastered several times, with some containing previously unreleased tracks.

Background and recording
On 31 July 1971, Yes performed the final concert of their 1970–71 tour at Crystal Palace Park, London in support of their previous album, The Yes Album (1971). The tour was significant for the band as it included their first set of gigs in the US which helped them gain momentum as The Yes Album and its single, "Your Move", reached the US top 40. The line-up during this time consisted of lead vocalist Jon Anderson, bassist Chris Squire, drummer Bill Bruford, keyboardist Tony Kaye, and guitarist Steve Howe. Following the tour, Yes started work on their next studio album that was originally conceived as a double with a combination of studio and live tracks, but it could not be realised due to the increased amount of time required to make it. Ideas to record in Miami, Florida with producer Tom Dowd also never came to fruition.

Rehearsals took place in August 1971 in a small studio in Shepherd Market in London. As recording began, Kaye was reluctant to expand his sound beyond his Hammond organ and piano and play newer instruments, like the Mellotron or Moog synthesizer, causing artistic disagreements with his bandmates, particularly Anderson and Squire. Kaye was sacked from Yes, and at manager Brian Lane's insistence, surrendered his royalties from the first three albums in exchange for a cash sum of around $10,000. A replacement was quickly found in Rick Wakeman, a classically-trained pianist with experience playing a wide variety of keyboards. Wakeman was a member of the folk rock band Strawbs and an in-demand session musician. He was offered a spot with David Bowie's touring band on the same day that he was asked to join Yes, but chose Yes due to the opportunity for more artistic freedom. He learned that the band were going to return to the US for another tour and flatly refused, but quickly realised that he was holding out on a good offer and accepted. Wakeman recalled the basis of "Roundabout" and "Heart of the Sunrise" were worked out by the end of his first day with the band. Squire spoke about that first session: "That marked the first real appearance of the Mellotron and Moog synthesizer on that—adding the flavour of those instruments to a piece we'd basically already worked out". Wakeman was surprised to see how often the group argued amongst themselves, and at one point shortly after his arrival thought they were going to split.

Recording took place in August and September 1971 at Advision Studios using a 16-track tape machine. Eddy Offord, who served as a recording engineer on Time and a Word (1970), assumed his role while sharing production duties with the band. Rolling Stone reported that the album cost $30,000 to produce. According to Michael Tait, the band's lighting director, Lane came up with the album's title while on the phone to "some press guy" enquiring about it: "He was looking at some photos from that Crystal Palace gig, saw the monitors at the front of the stage and, like all equipment, they had 'Fragile' stamped on the back". Bruford claimed he in fact suggested the title because he thought the band "was breakable" at the time. While the band were recording, Wakeman remembered children being brought into the studio to watch them play.

Songs
Fragile contains nine tracks; four are "group arranged and performed" with the remaining five being "the individual ideas, personally arranged and organised" by the five members, as described in the liner notes. Squire reasoned that this approach was necessary in part to save time and reduce studio costs: "We have a lot of mouths to feed. Rick ... had to buy a vast amount of new equipment when he joined, and it all costs much more money than people seem to imagine." According to Bruford: "There was this endless discussion about how the band could be used ... I felt we could use all five musicians differently ... So I said—brightly—'Why don't we do some individual things, whereby we all use the group for our own musical fantasy? I'll be the director, conductor, and maestro for the day, then you do your track, and so on.'" Wakeman commented on the album's structure: "Some critics thought this was just being flash. The thinking behind this was that we realised there would be a lot of new listeners coming to the band. They could find out where each individual player's contribution lay."

Side one

"Roundabout" was written by Anderson and Howe and has become an iconic track and is one of Yes's best-known songs. Howe recalled that the track was originally "a guitar instrumental suite ... I sort of write a song without a song. All the ingredients are there—all that's missing is the song. "Roundabout" was a bit like that; there was a structure, a melody and a few lines." The introduction was created by two piano chords played backwards, and Howe recorded the acoustic guitar part in the studio corridor as the recording room made it "sound too dead".

"Cans and Brahms" is Wakeman's adaptation of an excerpt of the third movement of Symphony No. 4 in E minor by Johannes Brahms, with an electric piano used for the string section, grand piano for the woodwinds, organ for the brass, electric harpsichord for reeds, and synthesizer as contrabassoon. Wakeman said the piece took an estimated 15 hours to create in the studio, and said it was most likely Bruford who inspired its title from looking at Wakeman playing each section while wearing his headphones. He looked back on the piece as "dreadful", as contractual problems with A&M Records, with whom he was signed as a solo artist, prevented him from writing a composition of his own.

Anderson described "We Have Heaven" as a "rolling idea of voices and things", with its two main sets of chants containing the phrases "Tell the Moon dog, tell the March hare" and "He is here, to look around". The track ends with the sound of a door closing followed by running footsteps, which segues into the atmospheric introduction to the next track, the group arranged "South Side of the Sky". Wakeman contributed piano interludes to the track and "Heart of the Sunrise", but did not receive credit because of publishing disputes with his two contracts. Although he was promised money by executives at Atlantic, he claims he never received it and avoided making a fuss because he was keen to be part of the music.

Side two
Side two opens with Bruford's track, "Five per Cent for Nothing". With a running time of thirty-five seconds, it is his "first attempt at composition—but we've all got to start somewhere". According to Tait, its original title was "Suddenly It's Wednesday", but it was changed in reference to Yes paying off their former manager Roy Flynn with the deal of five percent of future royalties. Yes performed the track live in 2014 and 2016 on tours that featured Fragile performed in its entirety. Howe said the secret to playing it successfully was to finish together. During rehearsals he kept close track of the beat count and would cue the rest of the band to it by dropping his guitar's headstock. Even with that, it took considerable practice for all musicians to end on the same beat.

Anderson's lyrics to "Long Distance Runaround" address "the craziness of religion" and how people are "taught that Christianity is the only way", which he called a "stupid doctrine". The lyrics to the second verse were inspired by the Kent State shootings in 1970 and the US government's crackdown on young people for criticising the Vietnam War. The song segues, after Howe plays a guitar run with an Echoplex delay effect, into Squire's solo track, "The Fish (Schindleria Praematurus)". Tait recalled that Anderson called him from Advision one evening and said, 'I want the name of a prehistoric fish in eight syllables. Call me back in half an hour'". Tait subsequently found Schindleria praematurus, a species of marine fish, in a copy of Guinness Book of Records. "Mood for a Day" is Howe's solo track, which was his second acoustic guitar solo put on a Yes album, following "Clap". He played a Conde flamenco guitar, but considers the album version substandard in comparison to how he learned to play it on stage years later.

"Heart of the Sunrise" originated as a love song that Anderson wrote for his then-wife Jennifer, which covered the sunrise and the inability for humans to fully understand it, and the "excitement and friction" of London's streets and one man feeling lost in it. The track is where Wakeman's classically-trained background came into play; he introduced the band to recapitulation, a musical concept where previous segments in a piece are revisited. Bruford considers it as the group's breakthrough piece in terms of originality: "It had the drama and the poise and the kind of fey, pastoral English-y lyrics at the beginning where the music all gives way to a slightly feminine vocal." Howe originally played the song on the ES-5 Switchmaster, but it failed to produce satisfactory results. He found success with his Gibson ES-175. Several seconds after the song, the sound of a door opening is heard before a reprise of "We Have Heaven" is played, acting as a hidden track.

Artwork

Fragile marks the start of the band's long association with English artist Roger Dean, who would design many of their future album covers, their logo, and live stage sets. In 1971 Dean submitted a portfolio to Phil Carson, then European General Manager of Atlantic Records, who said would contact Dean for work when one of his bands needed a cover artist, which became Yes.

Prior to starting on the cover, Dean had came up with a creation myth narrative about a child who dreamt they were living on a planet that started breaking up, so they built a "space ark" to find another planet to live on while towing the broken pieces with them. Dean was aware that the album's title described "the psyche" of the group at the time, which influenced his "very literal" design of a fragile Bonsai world that was going to break up. The band had wished for an image of a fractured piece of porcelain, but Dean ended up breaking the planet into two pieces as a compromise. Dean produced three versions of the cover with the planet in green, red, and blue, in an attempt to "get the right look." Bruford thought Dean "brilliantly parlayed that idea [one of Fragile] up to the prescient image of the fragile planet earth, with implications of a delicate and breakable eco-system." Dean continued the narrative in his artwork for Yes's first live album, Yessongs (1973), but his style had evolved by this time and the planet no longer looked like the Fragile original.

The LP's accompanying booklet contains two additional Dean paintings; the front cover depicts five creatures huddled under a root system, and the back depicts a person climbing up a rock formation. The inside features several photographs of the band with a page dedicated to each member, with smaller illustrations and photographs of their wives and children. Anderson's page contains a short poem, and Wakeman's includes a list of acknowledgements, including Mozart, The White Bear pub in Hounslow, and Brentford F.C.

Release
Fragile was released on 12 November 1971 in the UK. It was originally set for release a month prior, but the US division of Atlantic Records were concerned of bootlegged copies arriving early in the US and delayed its release. In addition The Yes Album and the single "Your Move" had started to gain momentum on the US charts, and Atlantic were not keen to put out a new release so soon. By December 1971, an estimated 10,000 copies of Fragile had made their way to the US.

Fragile was released in the US on 7 January 1972. It peaked at number 4 on the U.S. Billboard Top LPs chart and number 7 in the UK. In March 1972, the album reached Gold certification by the Recording Industry Association of America (RIAA). In 1998, it was certified double Platinum for selling 2 million copies in the US. Fragile was certified Silver by the British Phonographic Industry for 300,000 copies sold.

"Roundabout" was released as a single in the US with a shortened duration of 3:27, with "Long Distance Runaround" on the B-side. The cut was done by Atlantic's radio department without the band's knowledge, and Anderson and Howe were particularly shocked at the severe edits, but Anderson said it helped boost Yes's popularity and more people turned out to see them. It peaked at No. 13 on the Billboard Pop Singles chart in April 1972.

Reception

Fragile received a mostly positive reception upon its release. Billboard magazine selected the album in its "Billboard Pick" feature, describing it as "vibrant, soothing, tumultuous, placid and instrumentally brilliant" and Anderson's vocals "deliciously ingratiating". In his review for Rolling Stone, Richard Cromelin pointed out the album's "gorgeous melodies, intelligent, carefully crafted, constantly surprising arrangements, concise and energetic performances" and "cryptic but evocative lyrics", but pointed out that Yes "tend to succumb to the show-off syndrome. Their music (notably "We Have Heaven") often seems designed only to impress and tries too hard to call attention to itself". Kurt White reviewed the album in The Daily Reporter, calling Wakeman a "very talented organist". He named "Roundabout" the album's finest cut, "an eight-minute masterpiece incorporating unusual rhythm and music". He notes that despite its "limitations and faults", Fragile remains "interesting and enjoyable". Melody Maker gave a mixed review on 20 November 1971. It opened with: "'Fragile' does not seem to go anywhere or have any theme except displaying Yes' technical ability ... It's not until 'Heart of the Sunrise' that they get there. It's all a little too much like exercises, clever and beautifully played". The review praised "Roundabout" for Howe's guitar work and compared its style to "Yours is No Disgrace" from The Yes Album. Ed Keheller for Circus magazine summarised his review of the album with "Fragile is unquestionably their most cohesive and mettlesome undertaking".

In 2005, Fragile was included in the musical reference publication 1001 Albums You Must Hear Before You Die. In his review for AllMusic, Bruce Eder gave the album five stars out of five. He writes: "Fragile was Yes' breakthrough album, propelling them in a matter of weeks from a cult act to an international phenomenon; not coincidentally, it also marked the point where all of the elements of the music (and more) that would define their success for more than a decade fell into place fully formed. The science-fiction and fantasy elements that had driven the more successful songs on ... The Yes Album, were pushed much harder here, and not just in the music but in the packaging of the album: the Roger Dean-designed cover was itself a fascinating creation that seemed to relate to the music and drew the purchaser's attention in a manner that few records since the heyday of the psychedelic era could match." In 2014, readers of Rhythm voted it the sixth greatest drumming album in the history of progressive rock.

Reissues
Fragile was first reissued on CD in the United States and Europe in 1990. A remastered edition for CD and cassette by Joe Gastwirt followed in 1994, which includes a reprise of "We Have Heaven" after "Heart of the Sunrise" for a track running time of 11:32. In 2002, Rhino and Elektra Records released Fragile in stereo and 5.1 surround sound mixes for the DVD-Audio format. The band's cover of "America" is included, along with other supplemental features. 2003 saw Rhino and Elektra put out a new remastered CD conducted by Dan Hersch, with "America" and an early rough mix of "Roundabout" as bonus tracks.

In 2006, two new "audiophile" remasters were released. Mobile Fidelity Sound Lab put out a "24 KT Gold" edition for CD headed by Shawn Britton, and a 200-gram LP from Analogue Productions by Kevin Gray and Steve Hoffman. Warner Japan released Fragile in 2011 in a hybrid stereo/multi-channel edition for the Super Audio CD format as part of their Warner Premium Sound series. The 2003 reissue was included in the album box set The Studio Albums, 1969–1987, released in 2013.

Fragile was released in a new stereo and 5.1 surround sound mix on CD, DVD-Audio, and Blu-ray by Steven Wilson, on 30 October 2015. The Blu-ray disc features six previously unreleased tracks.

Track listing
Details are taken from the 1971 US Atlantic album (UK release does not list running times); other releases may show different information.

Personnel
Credits are adapted from the album's liner notes.

Yes
Jon Anderson – lead and backing vocals
Steve Howe – electric and acoustic guitars, backing vocals
Chris Squire – bass guitars, backing vocals, additional electric guitar
Rick Wakeman – Hammond organ, grand piano, RMI 368 Electra-Piano and Harpsichord, Mellotron, Minimoog synthesiser
Bill Bruford – drums, percussion

Production
Yes – production
Eddy Offord – engineer, production
Gary Martin – assistant engineer
Roger Dean – artwork, photography
David Wright – colour photo of Bruford on drums
Brian Lane – bank loan arrangement

Chart performance

Certifications

Notes and references
Notes

References

Sources

External links
 Official Yes website at YesWorld

Yes (band) albums
Albums with cover art by Roger Dean (artist)
1971 albums
Atlantic Records albums
Albums produced by Eddy Offord
Albums produced by Jon Anderson
Albums produced by Bill Bruford
Albums produced by Steve Howe (musician)
Albums produced by Chris Squire
Albums produced by Rick Wakeman